Constituent Assembly elections were held in Albania in November and December 1923,  with the second round taking place on 27 December.

Background
During 1923 tensions had been building between religious groups, with Christians unhappy at former Ottoman officials continuing to take advantage of their position and taxes from the wealthier Christian parts of the country subsidising a government led by the Muslim Ahmet Zogu. Following several political assassinations, in August Zogu agreed to a Constituent Assembly being elected later in the year.

Results
Zogu's faction won 44 seats and opposition candidates 39. The 19 independent candidates, most of whom were conservative, gave their support to Zogu, allowing him to form a government.

However, opposition parties alleged there had been electoral fraud, claiming that their strong performance in the first round of voting should have led to them winning a majority in the second round. The Dielli newspaper reported that the government had terrorised the electors into voting for their candidates.

Aftermath
The new parliament convened for the first time on 21 January 1924. Although Zogu was narrowly re-elected as Prime Minister, he resigned  two weeks later, allowing Shefqet Vërlaci to become head of government.

References

Parliamentary elections in Albania
1923 in Albania
Albania